Silence Therapeutics (Nasdaq:SLN), is a London-based pharmaceutical company formed in 1994. Since its origin, the company has been a pioneer in the design and development of short-interfering ribonucleic acid (siRNA) therapeutics for the treatment of rare diseases. Silence Therapeutics has offices in London, New Jersey, and Berlin, with its corporate headquarters located in Hammersmith, London).

Profile
Silence Therapeutics develops medicines by utilising the body's natural mechanism of RNA interference, or RNAi, to inhibit the expression of specific target genes thought to play a role in the pathology of diseases with significant unmet needs. Silence's mRNAi GOLD™ platform can be used to create siRNAs (short interfering RNAs) that target and silence disease-associated genes in the liver. Silence Therapeutic's product candidates include SLN360 designed to address the high and prevalent unmet medical need in reducing cardiovascular risk in people born with high levels of lipoprotein(a) and SLN124 designed to address rare hematological diseases.

Partnerships
Silence Therapeutics has partnerships with other pharmaceutical companies, such as AstraZeneca, Mallinckrodt Pharmaceuticals, and Hansoh Pharma, among others.

References

External links
 Official website

Pharmaceutical companies of England
Medical and health organisations based in England
Companies based in the London Borough of Hammersmith and Fulham
1994 establishments in England
Pharmaceutical companies established in 1994